In Currents is the third studio album by the Early November. It is their first release on Rise Records.

Release
In May and June 2012, the Early November went on tour with the Wonder Years, the Swellers and Young Statues. In Currents was released on July 10, 2012 following an extended hiatus, marking the band's first release in six years. In Currents debuted at number 43 on the Billboard 200. In October, the group went on a headlining US tour with Cartel and Seahaven in support of the album. In between some of the dates on the tour, the group supported All Time Low. On October 5, a music video was released for the title track, "In Currents". On May 22, 2013, a music video was released for "Tell Me Why". In the summer, the group performed on Warped Tour.

Track listing

Notes
 "That's Not Your Real Name" was originally released by Ace Enders on his 2012 EP "Share with Everyone".

Charts

References

The Early November albums
2012 albums
Rise Records albums